A Mother Returns (Italian: Una madre ritorna) is a 1952 Italian drama film directed by Roberto Bianchi Montero and starring Leopoldo Valentini, Linda Sini and Gianni Rizzo. The film's sets were designed by the art director Ivo Battelli.

Main cast
 Leopoldo Valentini as 	Romolo
 Linda Sini as 	Elena Sardi
 Gianni Rizzo as 	Carlo
 Ermanno Randi as 	Dino Dauri
 Adalberto Roni as 	Gigetto
 Gisella Monaldi as 	Sora Lalla	
 Saro Urzì as 	Nino

References

Bibliography 
 Chiti, Roberto & Poppi, Roberto. Dizionario del cinema italiano: Dal 1945 al 1959. Gremese Editore, 1991.

External links 
 

1952 films
Italian drama films
1952 drama films
1950s Italian-language films
Films directed by Roberto Bianchi Montero
1950s Italian films

it:Una madre ritorna